Lycée Français Saint-Exupery de Brazzaville (est. 1971) is a French international school in Brazzaville, Republic of the Congo. It serves levels maternelle (preschool) through lycée (senior high school).

References

External links
  Lycée Français Saint-Exupery de Brazzaville (Archive)

French international schools in the Republic of the Congo
Organisations based in Brazzaville
1971 establishments in the Republic of the Congo
Educational institutions established in 1971